I-29, code-named Matsu (松, Japanese for "pine tree"), was a B1 type submarine of the Imperial Japanese Navy used during World War II on two secret missions with Germany. She was sunk while returning from the second mission.

Construction
This was the most numerous class of Japanese submarines – almost 20 were built, of which only one survived.  These boats were fast, had a long range, and carried a seaplane, launched via a forward catapult.

The keel of I-29 was laid on 20 September 1939 at the Yokosuka Naval Arsenal and launched on 29 September 1940. She was commissioned on 27 February 1942, into the 14th submarine squadron under the command of Lieutenant Commander (later Captain) Izu Juichi (伊豆壽市).

Yanagi missions
The Yanagi missions fell under the Tripartite Pact which provided for an exchange of personnel, strategic materials and manufactured goods between Germany, Italy and Japan. Initially, cargo ships were used to make the exchanges, but when that was no longer possible submarines were used.

Of these, I-30 was sunk by a mine and I-34 by the British submarine . Later, the famous Japanese submarine  would also share their fate. In 1945 the German U-234 had completed part of the voyage to Japan when news of Germany's surrender to the Allies was announced, and the submarine was intercepted and boarded off Newfoundland; this marked the end of the German-Japanese submarine exchanges.

Service history

Missions
I-29 participated in missions supporting the Operation Mo attack on Port Moresby in New Guinea, and also in the futile search for Task Force 16 which had launched the Doolittle Raid on Tokyo in April 1942.

I-29s reconnaissance of Sydney harbour on 23 May 1942 resulted in the attack on Sydney Harbour by Japanese midget submarine

First exchange

In April 1943, I-29 was tasked with a Yanagi mission. She was commanded by Captain Masao Teraoka, submarine flotilla commander – indicating the importance of the trip.  She left Penang with a cargo that included two tons of gold as payment from Japan for weapons technology.  She met Fregattenkapitän Werner Musenberg's Type IXD-1 U-boat,  on 26 April 1943 off the coast of Mozambique.

During this meeting that lasted over 12 hours due to bad weather, the two submarines swapped several important passengers. U-180 transferred Netaji Subhas Chandra Bose, a leader of the Indian Independence Movement who was going from Berlin to Tokyo, and his adjutant, Abid Hasan.  I-29 in turn transferred two Japanese Navy personnel who were to study U-boat building techniques in Germany: Commander (later posthumously promoted to rear admiral) Emi Tetsushiro, and Lieutenant Commander (later posthumously promoted to captain) Tomonaga Hideo (who was later connected with the German submarine ).  Both submarines returned safely to their bases. I-29 landed her important passengers at Sabang on Weh Island, located to the north of Sumatra on 6 May 1943, instead of  Penang, to avoid detection by British spies. Bose and Hasan's transfer is the only known record of a civilian transfer between two submarines of two different navies in World War II.

Second exchange
On December 17, 1943, I-29 was dispatched on a second Yanagi mission, this time to Lorient, France, under star Japanese submarine Commander Takakazu Kinashi  Japan's highest-scoring submarine "ace". At Singapore she was loaded with 80 tons of raw rubber, 80 tons of tungsten, 50 tons of tin, two tons of zinc, and three tons of quinine, opium and coffee.

In spite of Allied Ultra decrypts of her mission, I-29 managed to reach Lorient on 11 March 1944. On her way she was refueled twice by German vessels. Also, she had three close brushes with Allied aircraft tracking her signals. One of which was an attack by six RAF aircraft including two Mosquito F Mk. At least one Ju 88 was shot down by British fighters over Spanish waters. The Kriegsmarine also provided an escort of two destroyers and two torpedo boats.

She left Lorient 16 April 1944 for the long voyage home with a cargo of 18 passengers, torpedo boat engines, Enigma coding machines, radar components, a Walter HWK 509A rocket engine, and Messerschmitt Me 163 and Messerschmitt Me 262 blueprints for the development of the rocket plane Mitsubishi J8M.  After an uneventful trip she arrived at Singapore on 14 July 1944, disembarking her passengers, though not the cargo.

Sinking
From using Ultra signal intelligence. During the evening of 26 July 1944, she was spotted by Sawfish  which fired four torpedoes at her. Only one of her crewmen survived. Kinashi was honored by a rare two-rank posthumous promotion to rear admiral.

Media
 I-29 is the submarine shown in the 2004 Bollywood film Netaji Subhas Chandra Bose: The Forgotten Hero where Netaji Subhas Chandra Bose travels with the German submarine U-180 around the Cape of Good Hope to the southeast of Madagascar, where he is transferred to the I-29, greeted aboard by her captain Masao Teraoka and continues the rest of the journey to Imperial Japan.

Notes

Sources

 Paterson, Lawrence. Hitler's Grey Wolves: U-Boats in the Indian Ocean., Mechanicsburg, PA: Stackpole Books, 2004, 287 pgs. Chapter II

Further reading
 Miller, Vernon. Analysis of Japanese Submarine Losses to Allied Submarines in World War II, Merriam Press Original Publication, 36 pgs.
 Boyd, Carl and Akihiko Yoshida. The Japanese Submarine Force and World War II., Annapolis: Naval Institute Press, 1995
 Jenkins, David. Battle Surface!: Japan's Submarine War Against Australia, 1942-44.  Milsons Point and London: Random House, 1992
 Goss, Chris. Bloody Biscay: The Story of the Luftwaffe's Only Long Range Maritime Fighter Unit, V Gruppe/Kampfgeschwader 40, and its Adversaries, 1942-1944. Manchester, England: Crecy Publishing, 1997, 254 pgs.
Clay Blair" Hitler's U-Boats War The Hunted 1942–1945

External links
 Photo of 1/48 scale replica of I-29
 Blueprints of B-1 class Japanese submarine
 Accomplishments of the USS Sawfish
 I-29 pictures of crew stay in France taken by Kriegsmarine. Album stolen by a GI in Lorient in 1945 and found c. 1994 in a Hawaii flea market (French)courtesy www.lazaloeil.com
 View a 1942 German propaganda newsreel on arrival in Lorient and stay of I-30 which inaugurated the Yanagi missions to Europe Courtesy www.lazaloeil.com

Type B1 submarines
Ships built by Yokosuka Naval Arsenal
1940 ships
World War II submarines of Japan
Japanese submarines lost during World War II
Shipwrecks in the Luzon Strait
World War II shipwrecks in the Pacific Ocean
Subhas Chandra Bose
Ships sunk by American submarines
Maritime incidents in July 1944
Submarines sunk by submarines